MTV Roadies 4 is the fourth season of reality game show MTV Roadies that aired on MTV India from 2006–2007. Hosted by MTV VJ Rannvijay, the show features 13 contestants who ride Hero Honda Karizma bikes on a journey where they endure "sun, snow, rain and physical and mental stress, while complex challenges are thrown at them from every direction." In keeping with the reality contest format, contestants at each episode can be eliminated from the game with a vote out. At the final destination, Gangtok, the winner is awarded a cash prize of up to 500,000 Indian rupees ( 5,00,000). Bollywood actor Gulshan Grover makes appearances in the season to introduce twists into the game. The show's winner was Anthony Yeh.

Format

The show is loosely inspired by the MTV-USA reality show Road Rules which started in 1995.

Contestants
Roadies auditions were held in Delhi, Chandigarh, Kolkata, Mumbai and, for the first time, Lucknow. A total of 13 Roadies, seven men and six women, were chosen. They are:
 Poonam Thacker
 Anthony Yeh
 Raj Roy
 Rishabh Dhir
 Swati Ahuja
 Shaleen Malhotra
 Sonam Gupta
 Roopali Anand
 Ankit Mohan
 Gurbani "Bani" Judge
 Vishal Karwal
 Sahil Anand
 Amandeep "Oorja" Narang

Journey

Episode 1
The Roadies start at the south at the Travancore Heritage Resort in Kerala. Their first immunity task is to find their Karizma bikes. However, Grover introduces a twist: he wants to eliminate a Roadie right away.
Roadie voted out: Oorja

Episode 2
The Roadies are divided into two teams: Chandigarh and Delhi.  Shaleen Malhotra and Gurbani "Bani" Judge have a big fight. Gurbani "Bani" Judge becomes a target in the Roadies eyes, especially the women. Parul Shahi, the winner of season 3, tells the Roadies the route to Cochin. The immunity task is a snake boat race. The Delhi team loses. Gurbani "Bani" Judge survives the vote out.
Roadie voted out: Ankit.

Episode 3
The Roadies participate in a bull run task, which team Chandigarh wins. Delhi votes out Shaleen Malhotra, which leaves their group to all women. Grover appears and informs the Roadies that there is a spy among them who could betray his or her team.
Roadie voted out: Shaleen Malhotra

Episode 4
The Roadies travel north to Jodhpur. They participate in a sawal-jawab round, and a money task in Mewar. The teams are redistributed slightly by gender so that all the women are on the Delhi team; they then face an immunity task. The women win the task. Vishal is voted out after he voices his opinion that more women need to go. The teams are almost even in size, however, the spy contestant is still unknown. Some of the Roadies suspect Rishabh may be the spy.
Roadie voted out: Vishal Karwal

Episode 5
The Roadies ride all day from Jodhpur to Pushkar. They have a nice dinner when Rannvijay enters and informs them that Grover has an important message: they must vote out the spy or else the spy will win all the money. The Roadies do a vote out. Rannvijay informs them that the vote was unanimous, which stuns everyone, but then he breaks the suspense and says that he was joking. At night, Roopali and Gurbani "Bani" Judge have a four-letter vocal battle over a bed sharing issue.

The next day, the Roadies are given a money task where they have to carry people from one place to another using a cart, however, the condition is that the age of the person carried must exceed the age of the team members combined. After completing the task, Rannvijay says Grover is calling for another vote out, but reminds them that the spy rule from yesterday still applies. The Roadies vote out Gurbani "Bani" Judge. Grover reveals that there is no spy in the Roadies and that it was all a ruse. However, the twist is that Gurbani "Bani" Judge stays, and her vote will dictate who would be eliminated. Bani reveals that she voted out Rishabh.
Roadie voted out: Rishabh

Episode 6
Gurbani "Bani" Judge tries to figure out who betrayed her in the previous episode's vote out; she gets into arguments with Sonam and Raj. She later tries to befriend the girls.

The following day, the Roadies, under their captain Anthony, travel from Pushkar to Jaipur, and stay at a resort. They are called out to dress in swimsuits for a money task. Rannvijay presents a box draped with a white cloth, and has Anthony assign a man and a woman to be helpers. The money task is to form teams of two, cover their bodies with honey, and roll around in the box, whose contents turn out to be full of currency notes. The notes that stick are added to their bank. The Roadies complete the task and win 32,500, which brings their total so far to 1,93,500.

The next event is an immunity task. The Roadies are split onto groups of two, and they must perform an item number in front of a crowd and a judge, Rakhi Sawant, who also advises them on latkas and jhatkas. They perform the following item numbers.
 Team 1: Raj and Poonam sing "Bardaasht Nahin Kar Sakta"
 Team 2: Sahil and Bani sing "Chamma Chamma" from China Gate.
 Team 3: Anthony and Roopali sing "Kiss Me Baby" from Garam Masala.
 Team 4: Swati and Sonam sing "Ishq Di Gali vich" from No Entry.

Sawant selects Anthony and Roopali as the winners for immunity. Then there is a vote out, however, Grover has called Rannvijay on the rules for the vote out: each Roadie gets two votes, and two Roadies will be heading home.  After the votes are tallied, Bani, Sonam, and Swati are tied with four votes each, so they have a runoff vote with the three. Bani gets the fewest votes and survives elimination.

Roadies voted out: Sonam and Swati

Episode 7
Roadies set to leave for Bathinda, Punjab, where they get grand welcome and family like treatment after so long.

First the money task takes place that consists of Kabaddi match between roadies and national level players along with the twist of blindfolding both teams. The first of the two matches happens between boys teams, players being blindfolded are guided by girl team members. The final boys tag is 3–1 loss. The same happens with the girl teams and their final tag is 3–1 loss. Roadies are awarded Rs.10000 for each tag making a Rs.20000 for the whole task, Thus roadies account totalled a Rs.2,13,500.

Later Roadies enjoy the VIP treatment from gurudwara they stayed at and the local villagers and dance to Punjabi beats and blend into colors of Punjab. Following morning they head to Patiyala for their immunity task where 3 teams are formed of 2 each. 1 roadie out of each team has to climb a ladder and blow a whistle tied on the top, while the other team member is set on fire until the whistle is blown. Roopali and Anthony win the immunity.

Roadie voted out: Sahil

Episode 8
The Roadies travel to the Tivoli Garden Resort Hotel in Delhi. They receive a scroll that tells them to choose one guy and one girl to have their hair streaked.  The Roadies decide on Anthony and Bani, although Poonam expresses interest.

The money task involves shooting baskets while riding their Karizma bikes. The Roadies complete the task and even get a bonus round. Their winnings are  32,000. After returning to the hotel, they get a scroll that tells them to dress up for a party, however, when they arrive, they are called for another double vote out. Bani and Roopali receive the most votes, however, they are informed that only one of them will be leaving the next day. In the runoff competition, Roopali and Bani climb a wall and rappel on their stomach while bringing keys to unlock boxes, one of which has the winning chit. Bani manages to unlock the winning box.

Roadie eliminated: Roopali

Episode 9
The Roadies travel from Delhi to Guwahati. From the airport, they head to Nehru Stadium. For the money task, they must play footvolley (volleyball using only their feet) against the Assamese team, but the Roadies are allowed to use hands. The Roadies score 17 out of 21 points. Later, Poonam wins the immunity task.

There is a vote out where Bani is selected. However, as Bani finishes saying goodbye, Rishabh surprises everyone by arriving. Rannvijay informs everyone that Bani is not leaving, but instead Rishabh will rejoin the game as a wild card.

Roadie added: Rishabh

Episode 10
The Roadies arrive in Goalpara and camp out near a lake. The next morning, Rannvijay tells them their money task: they must each choose a packet and eat what is inside. Three of the five packets contain fried silkworms, while the other two contain a single chili pepper. Raj, Bani, and Anthony pick the silkworms; Rishabh and Poonam pick the peppers. However Rannvijay then informs them that the pepper type is noted as the world's hottest according to the Guinness World Records. The Roadies manage to eat the silkworms and chiles, and earn 50,000 towards their running total of 3,80,500. They then have a vote out. As Rishabh leaves, he warns the others not to trust Raj.

Roadie voted out: Rishabh

Episode 11
In the money task, the Roadies try to score goals with penalty kicks. Their total bank account is now at 3,75,500. In the immunity task, the Roadies have to stand on wooden poles while balancing bowls of water on their head, palms, and knees, much like a Shaolin monk. The one who stays there the longest without falling or dropping a bowl wins.  Raj wins. In the vote out, there is a tie between Poonam and Anthony, but Raj changes his mind and sides with Anthony.

Roadie voted out: Poonam

Episode 12
The Roadies have travelled about 8400 km and visited eight states in 40 days. Raj, Bani, and Anthony are the remaining three Roadies.  They stop at Hanuman Tok where they are introduced to their final immunity task: Deadly Hangman. The Roadies have their hands tied behind them and will be on a see-saw with the noose around their neck. They must untie hands, noose, and jump off before the balance tips. The person with the fastest time wins immunity, in a twist, the person with the slowest time is eliminated. Anthony manages to score the fastest escape.

Roadie eliminated: Raj

Episode 13
The Roadies travel the final 100 km of their journey to Gangtok. Anthony and Bani are grilled heavily by the other Roadies, who are given the task of choosing the winner. After the other Roadies submit their votes, Anthony and Bani are asked to predict the outcome, but it does not matter as Anthony wins MTV Roadies 4.

Roadies Winner: Anthony

Runner Up: Bani

Epilogue

Anthony has not kept in touch with Media Line, but he and his family have moved to Canada, where he is pursuing further studies and working.

Bani joined MTV and worked as a VJ. She is also the host of MTV Wassup, and landed a role in the film Aap Kaa Surroor.

Poonam worked for a BPO in Delhi, married a colleague there and is now a hair stylist in a famous salon in Mumbai.

Raj became a professional DJ and Remixer in Kolkata after participating in UTV Movies/Bindass Stunner 10. He won a war of the DJs in Kolkata. He is a national freelance Dj and runs a DJ management company, Casablanca Studios.

Roopali Anand returned as an All-Star for Roadies X – Battle for Glory. She finished in 10th place.

Results Chart

 = Indicates that the Roadie was present in the episode.

 = Indicates that the Roadie was not present in the episode because to getting voted out.

Notes

References

External links
 
 Rodies Official Blog, Photos and Profiles

MTV Roadies
2006 Indian television seasons
2007 Indian television seasons